Abominable is a 2019 computer-animated adventure film produced by DreamWorks Animation and Pearl Studio, written and directed by Jill Culton and co-directed by Todd Wilderman, and stars the voices of Chloe Bennet, Albert Tsai, Tenzing Norgay Trainor, Eddie Izzard, Sarah Paulson, Tsai Chin, and Michelle Wong. The film follows a teenage girl named Yi, who encounters a young Yeti on the roof of her apartment building in Shanghai, names him Everest and embarks on an epic quest to reunite the magical creature with his family at the highest point on Earth along with her mischievous friends Jin and Peng, but the trio of friends will have to stay one-step ahead of Burnish, a wealthy man intent on capturing a Yeti, and zoologist Dr. Zara to help Everest get home.

The film premiered at the Toronto International Film Festival on September 7, 2019, and was released by Universal Pictures in the United States on September 27 while Pearl Studio distributed the film in China. The film received generally positive reviews from critics and has grossed over $188 million worldwide. In Southeast Asia, Abominable has garnered controversy for a scene involving a map of the region with the Nine-dash line, a contested demarcation line used by China to lay claim over a portion of the South China Sea. Due to this, the film has been banned in several countries involved in territorial disputes with China over the South China Sea—namely, the Philippines, Vietnam, and Malaysia.

A follow-up television series, Abominable and the Invisible City, was released on streaming service Peacock and Hulu in October 2022.

Plot
A young Yeti escapes from a compound in Shanghai owned by wealthy businessman Mr. Burnish, who intends to use him to prove the existence of yetis to the world. Meanwhile, teenager Yi lives with her mother and Nai Nai (grandmother) in an apartment building. She leads a busy life, and neglects to spend time with her family and her friends, basketball fan Peng and his tech-savvy and popular cousin Jin. Yi is also a violinist, but has not played since her father's death, as he was a violinist, too.

One evening, Yi encounters the Yeti near her cubby house on the roof of her Shanghai apartment building, and names him "Everest". While hiding him from Burnish Industries' helicopters, Yi gains his trust by feeding him baozi and treating his wounds. Yi learns that Everest wants to reunite with his family on Mount Everest, while Everest learns about Yi's desire to travel across China - something her father had always wanted. When Burnish Industries' private security forces close in on Everest' hiding place, Everest flees with Yi. After narrowly escaping a Burnish helicopter at the Oriental Pearl Tower, Yi and Everest flee on a ship carrying red cola cans, followed by Peng and a reluctant Jin.

Yi, Everest, and the boys reach a port in southern China and travel on a truck. After their crate falls off the truck, they end up in a forest. There, Everest awes the humans with his mystical powers of stimulating growth among blueberry plants. Meanwhile, Mr. Burnish and zoologist Dr. Zara continue the hunt for Everest. Following Everest and his human friends' trail, they catch up with them in the Sichuan region, where Everest uses his power to cause a plant to grow to a gigantic size. While Yi, Everest, and Peng manage to escape on the wind-blown shoot, Jin is left behind and captured by Burnish Industries' Goon Leader.

Despite Zara's pretense of caring for animals, Jin learns that she is planning to hunt down the yeti to sell it. He also learns that the seemingly cold-hearted Burnish has a soft spot for animals, including Zara's pet albino jerboa Duchess. He manages to escape the camp, and pursues the others on foot. Meanwhile, Yi, Everest, and Peng reach the Gobi Desert, where they befriend several tortoises, who gratefully accept their giant shoot. Later, they travel to a town on the banks of the Yellow River, where Burnish Industries corners them. Peng helps them escape by unleashing a yak stampede. With the help of Jin, they escape across the Yellow River to a field of yellow flowers, which Everest causes to move like waves, creating more distance from their pursuers.

Continuing their journey, which Yi realizes echoes her father's dream trip exactly, the humans and Everest eventually reach the Himalayas. While crossing a bridge, they are trapped on both sides by Burnish Industries' forces. However, Burnish experiences a change of heart after seeing Everest protecting the children, causing him to experience a flashback to his first encounter with a female yeti, which was protecting her young. Still seeking to sell Everest, Zara injects Burnish with a tranquilizer before tranquilizing Everest as well. When Yi tries to protect Everest, Zara throws her over the bridge, then departs the mountain with the captive Everest, Peng, and Jin in tow.

However, Yi manages to cling on to a rope. She then uses her violin, which Everest has magically repaired, to summon ice. This reinvigorates Everest, who breaks free of his cage. Zara attempts to kill Everest and sell his parts instead, but the avalanche she causes knocks her and the Goon Leader off the cliffside to their deaths.

To protect Everest and the yetis from humanity, Burnish agrees to help Yi, Peng, and Jin keep his existence a secret. Yi, Peng, Jin, and Everest continue the journey to Mount Everest, where they reunite Everest with his family.

Returning home to Shanghai with the help of Burnish, Yi spends more time with her mother, grandmother, Peng, and Jin.

Cast

Production
Abominable was in development at DreamWorks Animation since 2010. For some time, Jill Culton was writing and directing the film, originally titled Everest, which was about a little girl and a Yeti, but by 2016, she had left the project. She was then replaced by Tim Johnson and Todd Wilderman.

In December 2016, DreamWorks announced that the film would be released on September 27, 2019, and that it would be co-produced by Oriental DreamWorks (now Pearl Studio), marking their second collaboration after Kung Fu Panda 3. On February 2, 2018, it was announced that Culton had returned as the director, replacing Johnson who became an executive producer with Frank Zhu and Li Ruigang. On March 20, 2018, it was announced that Chloe Bennet has been cast in the lead role as Yi. On May 18, 2018, DreamWorks and Pearl Studio announced that the film has been retitled from Everest to Abominable, and Albert Tsai, Tenzing Norgay Trainor, and Tsai Chin were cast the following month.

Music
The film's music was composed by Rupert Gregson-Williams, who had previously collaborated with the studio on Over the Hedge and Bee Movie, this also makes it the first DreamWorks animated film to be composed by a Gregson-Williams since Shrek Forever After, which was composed by his older brother, Harry Gregson-Williams. Also featured on the soundtrack is an original song titled "Beautiful Life" sung by American musician, Bebe Rexha. The film also featured a version of Coldplay's Fix You. The soundtrack was released digitally on September 13, 2019 by Back Lot Music.

Release
Abominable had its world premiere at the Toronto International Film Festival on September 7, 2019. The film was released on September 27, 2019 in the United States and on October 11 in the United Kingdom by Universal Pictures. Universal also handles worldwide distribution alongside various regional partners except for China, where the film was solely distributed by co-producer Pearl Studio, who (under their former name of Oriental DreamWorks) had distributed all of DreamWorks Animation's films in the country since the partnership began.

Home media
Abominable was released on digital and Movies Anywhere by Universal Pictures Home Entertainment on December 3, 2019, with Blu-ray, 4K Ultra HD and DVD releases following on December 17. All releases included two short films like Show and Tell, an short focusing on Everest showing the Yetis of the human life, animated by Company 3 Animation, and Marooned, which had previously been screened at the 2019 Annecy International Animated Film Festival and as part of a cross-promotion between DreamWorks Animation and AMC Theatres. The 4K Ultra HD version additionally uses HDR10+, making it Universal's second animated film to use the format after The Secret Life of Pets 2 and their sixth film overall.

Reception

Box office
Abominable has grossed $60.8 million in the United States and Canada, and $127.9 million in other territories, for a worldwide total of $188.7 million, against a production budget of $75 million.

In the United States and Canada, the film was projected to gross $17–20 million from 4,200 theaters in its opening weekend. The film made $5.7 million on its first day, including $650,000 from Thursday night previews. It went on to debut to $20.9 million, finishing first at the box office and marking the best opening for an original animated film of 2019. The film made $12 million in its second weekend, finishing second behind newcomer Joker.

Critical response
The website's critics consensus reads, "Working with admittedly familiar ingredients, Abominable offers audiences a beautifully animated and overall engaging adventure that the whole family can enjoy." On Metacritic, the film has an weighted average score of 61 out of 100 based on 28 critics, indicating "generally favorable reviews." Audiences polled by CinemaScore gave the film an average grade of "A" on an A+ to F scale, while those at PostTrak gave it an average 4 out of 5 stars.

Brian Tallerico of RogerEbert.com gave Abominable two out of four stars, opining that it "lack[ed] the personality to distinguish it from superior animated films that cover most of the same ground." Similarly, Peter Travers of Rolling Stone gave the film 2.5 out of five stars, likening it to fellow DreamWorks film How to Train Your Dragon (2010). While praising Yi's violin music and the animated scenes featuring whooping snakes and Everest' visual wonders, he thought that Abominable failed to distinguish itself in a crowded market. Glenn Kenny of The New York Times praised the film for its "exceptionally watchable and amiable" story and animated visual effects.

Clarissa Loughrey of The Independent gave Abominable three out of five stars, describing the film as "occasionally original, but not quite daring enough." She also praised the director Jill Culton for writing Yi as a grounded and authentic female protagonist while avoiding forcing her to prove herself and shoe-horned romances. Nick De Semiyen of Empire magazine awarded Abominable three out of five stars. He praised the film for its first female animated film director Culton, female lead character Yi, and for embracing its Chinese milieu including Yi's grandma Nai Nai. However, he observed that the film brought nothing new to the animation medium but praised it for incorporating a reference to Indiana Jones and the Last Crusade.

Peter Bradshaw of The Guardian gave Abominable two out of five stars, regarding the yeti as a bland character and observing the film's similarities to How to Train Your Dragon and E.T. the Extra-Terrestrial. By contrast, Simran Hans of The Observer gave the film a more favorable review, awarding it three out of five stars. She praised the film for its animation effects of the yeti's magical powers and also likened the film to How to Train Your Dragon.

Accolades

Nine-dash line controversy
The film was banned in Vietnam on October 14, 2019, ten days after its release, due to the appearance of the Nine-dash line in a scene. The Philippines and Malaysia also reacted negatively to this scene. Filipino lawyer Jay Batongbacal requested that the film be banned, while the Philippines' Secretary of Foreign Affairs Teodoro Locsin Jr. thought it was better to cut the scene in question. On October 17, Malaysia ordered the scene be cut from the film through its film censorship board. However, after Universal refused to make the censor cut, the film was banned entirely in Malaysia. The following day, the Philippines' Movie and Television Review and Classification Board followed suit, also banning the film.

Television series 
On February 11, 2022, it was announced that Peacock had ordered a CG animated series from DreamWorks Animation Television serving as a follow up to the film, titled Abominable and the Invisible City. The series chronicles Yi, Jin and Peng learning more about Everest and the magical creatures of the world. Spirit Riding Free workers Jim Schumann and Katherine Nolfi executive produce the series, Tiffany Lo and Ethel Lung serve as story editors, Bennet and Trainor reprised their roles of Yi and Jin from the film with Alan Cumming replacing Izzard as Burnish. The series was released on October 5, 2022 with 10 episodes on Peacock and Hulu. Season 2 will premiere on March 29, 2023.

References

External links

2019 films
2019 3D films
2019 computer-animated films
2010s American animated films
2010s adventure comedy films
2010s coming-of-age comedy films
American children's animated adventure films
American children's animated comedy films
American computer-animated films
American 3D films
3D animated films
American adventure comedy films
Censored films
Chinese 3D films
Chinese adventure comedy films
Chinese children's films
Chinese computer-animated films
Anime-influenced Western animation
DreamWorks Animation animated films
Animated coming-of-age films
English-language Chinese films
Films adapted into television shows
Films scored by Rupert Gregson-Williams
Films set in China
Films set in Shanghai
Universal Pictures animated films
Universal Pictures films
Films about Yeti
2019 comedy films
Film controversies
Film controversies in the Philippines
Avalanches in film
2010s English-language films